This article lists orbital and suborbital launches during the first half of the year 2021.

For all other spaceflight activities, see 2021 in spaceflight. For launches in the second half of 2021 see List of spaceflight launches in July–December 2021.



Orbital launches 

|colspan=8 style="background:white;"|

January 
|-

|colspan=8 style="background:white;"|

February 
|-

|colspan=8 style="background:white;"|

March 
|-

|colspan=8 style="background:white;"|

April 
|-

|colspan=8 style="background:white;"|

May 
|-

|colspan=8 style="background:white;"|

June 
|-

|colspan=8 style="background:white;"| 
|-
|colspan=8 style="background:white;"| 
|}

Suborbital flights

|}

References

External links

2021 in spaceflight
Spaceflight by year
Spaceflight